Ivan Lepinjica (born 9 July 1999) is a Croatian professional footballer who plays as a midfielder for  club Arminia Bielefeld, on loan from Rijeka. He is the son of former footballer Dragan Lepinjica.

Club career
On 12 August 2022, Lepinjica joined Arminia Bielefeld in the 2. Bundesliga on loan with an option to buy.

Career statistics

Club

Honours
Rijeka
Croatian Cup: 2018–19, 2019–20

References

External links
HNK Rijeka Profile

1999 births
Living people
Footballers from Rijeka
Croatian people of Serbian descent
Association football midfielders
Croatian footballers
Croatia youth international footballers
Croatia under-21 international footballers
NK Zadar players
HNK Rijeka players
Arminia Bielefeld players
First Football League (Croatia) players
Croatian Football League players
2. Bundesliga players
Croatian expatriate footballers
Expatriate footballers in Germany
Croatian expatriate sportspeople in Germany